Léandre Lacroix (1 January 1859 – 28 March 1935) was a Luxembourgish politician and jurist.  He served as the Mayor of Luxembourg City between 1914 and 1918.  He was chosen by Grand Duchess Marie-Adelaide over his socialist rival Luc Housse, who would eventually succeed him in 1918.

There is a street in Limpertsberg, Luxembourg City, named after Lacroix (rue Léandre Lacroix).

Footnotes

References
 

Mayors of Luxembourg City
Liberal League (Luxembourg) politicians
Luxembourgian jurists
Luxembourgian people of World War I

1859 births
1935 deaths
People from Remich